Nana Akua Oppong Birmeh is a Ghanaian architect.

Biography 
She founded the architecture firm Arch Xenus in 2011.

In November 2021, she was appointed as a member of the governing board of the newly-created Land Use and Spatial Planning Authority (LUSPA), representing the Ghana Institute of Architects.

Awards 

 2017: Forty under 40 Awards organized by Xodus Communications Limited (event agency) under architecture/design/décor
 2017: BBC's 100 Women

References

External links 

 The All Female-Led Architecture Firm Poised To Change Ghana’s Skyline, Business World Ghana

 
Living people
Ghanaian architects
BBC 100 Women
1980s births
Place of birth missing (living people)